The Pink Blueprint is the 18th cartoon produced in the Pink Panther series. A total of 124 6-minute cartoons were produced between 1964 and 1980.

Plot
A frustrated building contractor (the "Little Man") battles with the Pink Panther over the design of a house being built. The original design has blue overtones and a more traditional "milk carton" shape; conversely, the panther's is futuristically rounded, sleek, and all pink. Several unsuccessful attempts are made at swapping the original house blueprint with the pink version. In conclusion, it appears that Pink Panther gets the outlandish house he wants, but it is really the boringly-designed house the contractor was going to build, with a fancy-looking pink "facade" (false-front wall) loosely tacked onto the front for disguise.

Notes
 The concept of substituting a pink version of something for the original color was borrowed from The Pink Phink, wherein the Little Man is trying to paint a house blue but the Panther prefers pink paint. Both The Pink Blueprint and The Pink Phink were nominated for an Academy Award for Best Animated Short Film, with the latter winning.
 Footage from The Pink Blueprint would be reused as a flashback in the made-for-television entry Pinkologist, wherein the Little Man goes to see a shrink because he is going insane from the Panther's frequent and infuriating interference in his life over the past years.  Pink Posies also utilizes this same replacing-another-color-with-pink concept, wherein the Panther secretly pulls up all of the yellow flowers that the Little Man plants and replaces them with identically-shaped pink flowers, initially causing the gardener to question his own eyesight, health, and sanity; he later becomes maniacally frustrated when pink flowers continue to appear no matter what he does, and so when he eventually does catch sight of the mischievous feline and realizes that Pinky is the true cause of the flower-color-changing problem, the enraged gardener ferociously pursues Pinky around the yard with his riding lawnmower.
 The Pink Panther Show contained a laugh track when the Pink Panther cartoons were broadcast on NBC-TV. When MGM released all 124 Pink Panther cartoons on DVD in 2006, the theatrical versions were, for the most part, utilized. However, several television prints made their way onto the DVD set, The Pink Blueprint being one of them.

See also
List of American films of 1966
 List of The Pink Panther cartoons

References

Further sources
 Meet the Pink Panther; by Hope Freleng and Sybil Freleng , (Universe Publishing, 2005).
 The Pink Panther Classic Cartoon Collection  (2006). [DVD set]. New York: MGM Home Video.
 DePatie-Freleng website

1966 films
1966 animated films
1960s American animated films
1960s animated short films
American animated short films
The Pink Panther (cartoons) animated shorts
Films scored by William Lava
DePatie–Freleng Enterprises short films
Animated films about cats
Animated films without speech